Sisyrinchium rosulatum, commonly known as annual blue-eyed grass and fairy star, is a species of wildflower. It is a member of the iris family (Iridaceae). It grows in the southeastern United States and Hawaii. The species may overlap with Sisyrinchium micranthum.

References

rosulatum
Flora of the Southeastern United States
Flora of Hawaii
Flora without expected TNC conservation status